Subartonys is a village in Varėna district municipality, in Alytus County, in southeastern Lithuania. According to the 2001 census, the village had a population of 75 people.

Notable people
  (1836–1903), ethnographer
 Vincas Krėvė-Mickevičius (1882–1954), writer, poet, novelist, playwright and philologist

References

Villages in Alytus County
Varėna District Municipality
Troksky Uyezd